Love Will Come: The Music of Vince Guaraldi, Volume 2 is the 16th album by pianist George Winston and 12th solo piano album, released on February 2, 2010. The album is a follow-up to the well-received 1996 tribute album highlighting much of Guaraldi's Peanuts works, Linus and Lucy: The Music of Vince Guaraldi.

Track listing 
All songs composed by Vince Guaraldi except † = composed by George Winston; †† = composed by Vince Guaraldi, Lee Mendelson

*denotes iTunes bonus track

References

External links
 Liner notes

2010 albums
George Winston albums
Vince Guaraldi tribute albums
RCA Records albums